Lundarbrekka is a hamlet in Northeast, Iceland, just off the Lundarbrekkuveger road. It is situated on the east side of a valley, as the crow flies, from Aldeyjarfoss. There is a historic farm in the hamlet.

References 

Populated places in Northeastern Region (Iceland)